Bryan Smith (born June 24, 1983) is an American professional motorcycle racer from Flint, Michigan.

Career

Smith has been racing for over fourteen years. In 2015, Smith competed in his first X Games, winning gold in the Flat-Track event. Smith has won five races at the Illinois State Fairgrounds Racetrack, the latest being the AMA Pro Flat Track Grand National Championship.

Early Career Began racing BMX at age six, then moved to Flat Track and Ice Racing at age seven.

2014 
Smith looked to have the GNC1 championship in his grasp until a smoking bike led to a black flag at Calistoga. Smith didn't bring the bike into the pits and was later disqualified, forfeiting the points from a second place showing and putting himself just too far behind eventual champion Jared Mees. Smith's remarkable season included a series-best five victories, including Kawasaki's first ever Half-Mile win. Outside of the disqualification, Smith was in the top 10 in every race except for the opener at Daytona.

2013 
Smith excelled on mile-long courses, winning two races on his way to earning the coveted GNC Expert Twins Championship.

2012
Two wins and 12 top 10 finishes helped Smith win the GNC Expert Twins Championship. Finished fourth in the overall standings and locked in 11 Top 5s. His two wins came at the Cal Expo and the Illinois State Fairgrounds. Both victories came on mile-long tracks.

2011 
Smith won the California Expo Fair GNC Twins event. He also earned two Top10s and six Top5s. Raced with Fasthog.com Harley-Davidson/Honda.

2010 
Smith had an impressive season, winning the Indianapolis Mile in front of the MotoGP crowd on board his Ninja 650 Kawasaki, and following it up with a win at the Springfield Mile September 5. Raced with Monster Energy/Kawasaki/Werner-Springsteen Racing team.

2009 
Smith won the AMA Pro Grand National Twins race at Lima, podiumed twice at Indianapolis and Grove City, and had a total of six Top5 finishes. Raced with Moroneys Screamin Eagle Harley-Davidson race team.

2008
Finished 2nd in twins points, with one win at the Beulah Mile in Ohio. Also earned one podium in the singles at the Daytona Short Track.

2007 
Finished third in the twins points, had one win in the single division at the Castle Rock ST.

2006
Won two GNC events - the opening round at the Daytona Short Track and the fall Springfield Mile, finishing the year third in the twins points.

2005 
Joined the Moroney's H-D team and earned a few podiums.

Sacramento Mile

Smith won the Sacramento Mile a record seven times in a row, from 2011 to 2017.

X Games Harley-Davidson Flat-Track

Smith won a gold medal in the 2015 X Games Harley-Davidson Flat-Track.

Superprestigio of the Americas

Smith placed 4th in the Flat Track Final and 8th in the Superprestigio Final at the inaugural Superprestigio of the Americas on November 21, 2015.

References

External links
 

1983 births
Living people
American motorcycle racers
Sportspeople from Flint, Michigan